El Tráfico, also known as the Los Angeles Derby, is a soccer rivalry between the two Major League Soccer (MLS) clubs based in the Greater Los Angeles area, LA Galaxy and Los Angeles FC. The rivalry is one of two crosstown derbies in MLS, alongside the Hudson River Derby in the New York City area, and replaced the SuperClasico between the LA Galaxy and now defunct Chivas USA.

This matchup has been characterized by dramatic goals, high scoring, and consistently close results, as well as mutual fan animosity. Despite it being only five seasons since LAFC came into existence, the rivalry has quickly been considered one of the best on the continent, rivaling the match considered the country's "gold standard," Timbers-Sounders. Conversely, due to its brief existence, it has sometimes been described as a manufactured rivalry.

Background

Los Angeles FC was established in 2014, shortly after the dissolution of Chivas USA, an MLS franchise based in Los Angeles and owned by C.D. Guadalajara. Chivas shared the StubHub Center in Carson, originally known as the Home Depot Center (2003–2013) and now known as Dignity Health Sports Park, with the Galaxy but had far lower attendances during its final years of operation. The two teams competed in the SuperClasico, named for the Mexican rivalry between Guadalajara and Club América. The two teams met 31 times in ten seasons, with the Galaxy winning 20 matches and Chivas winning four.

LAFC's owners have also expressed interest in hosting rivalry matches at the larger Los Angeles Memorial Coliseum, also located in Exposition Park.

History

The two teams' academies met for the first time in September 2016, ending in a 3–3 draw.

The first match between the two senior teams, LAFC's third-ever regular season game, was played on March 31, 2018, at the StubHub Center. Despite LAFC leading 3–0 after 60 minutes, the match ended in a 4–3 win for the Galaxy, including two goals from substitute Zlatan Ibrahimović on his debut. The teams played at Banc of California Stadium on July 26 and was followed by a second match at the StubHub Center on August 24 during MLS Rivalry Week. The second meeting, on July 26, ended in a 2–2 draw at the Banc of California Stadium. Six fans were arrested in clashes between fans at the stadium, where seats were damaged and fights broke out. The final meeting of the two teams in 2018, played a month later on August 24, ended in a 1–1 draw at the StubHub Center.

The first El Tráfico match of the 2019 season, played in July at Dignity Health Sports Park (formerly the StubHub Center), ended in a 3–2 victory for the hosting LA Galaxy. Ibrahimović's scored all three Galaxy goals and earned a hat-trick, while Carlos Vela scored both of LAFC's goals. The visiting LAFC supporters came in a 17-bus convoy and wore camouflage outfits as part of a "united front", having been inspired by a similar display by German club Dynamo Dresden. The return fixture at Banc of California Stadium a month later ended in a 3–3 draw, with two goals apiece for Ibrahimović and Latif Blessing after a second-half comeback from LAFC.

The two teams met in the Western Conference Semifinals during the 2019 MLS Cup Playoffs, which was hosted by top-seeded LAFC after the Galaxy advanced from the first round against Minnesota United FC. LAFC won 5–3, breaking a six-match winless streak against the Galaxy, with pairs of goals scored by Vela and Adama Diomande. LAFC advanced to the Conference Final, where they lost 3–1 to Seattle Sounders FC, the eventual MLS Cup 2019 champions.

The opening El Tráfico fixture of the 2020 season was scheduled for May 16, but MLS suspended all operations in March due to the COVID-19 pandemic. The two teams were drawn into Group F of the MLS is Back Tournament, which would be played without spectators at the ESPN Wide World of Sports Complex in Florida. LAFC and the Galaxy met in the second matchday on July 18, 2020, with Vela opting out of the tournament and the Galaxy's Javier Hernández injured. LAFC won 6–2, setting a new record for largest margin of victory in El Tráfico, with four goals from Diego Rossi; both of the Galaxy's goals had come in the first 31 minutes, from an own goal and a penalty kick. The most recent El Tráfico matchup took place at Banc of California Stadium on October 20, 2022, where LAFC won 3-2 in the second playoff meeting. 

The Galaxy planned to host their 2023 season opener on February 25 against LAFC at the Rose Bowl, the Galaxy's former stadium from 1996 to 2002. It was postponed to July 4 due to heavy wind and rain in the area brought by a major winter storm. A third match against designated rivals was added to the MLS schedule in 2023; LAFC expressed interest in potentially hosting the game at either the Coliseum or SoFi Stadium in 2024.

Fan activities

In January 2018, a mural commissioned by LAFC in Pico-Union was vandalized with the colors of the Galaxy within hours of being completed and unveiled. This followed an earlier incident where paint in LAFC's colors was sprayed over a Galaxy mural at Hawthorne Memorial Park and a Galaxy billboard. Both fanbases later defaced property during the inaugural year of the rivalry.

The clubs and fanbases have created a unique animosity between one another. For example, LAFC fans refuse to acknowledge the title "LA Galaxy," claiming (albeit technically correctly) that the Galaxy do not play in Los Angeles proper, and frequently refer to the older club as "Carson," since the Galaxy play in Carson, California, an inner suburb of Los Angeles. In addition, LAFC itself simply calls its rival "Galaxy."
 Galaxy fans frequently mock LAFC and its fans as "Chivas 2.0" as an allusion to the former Chivas USA, whose shutdown led to the creation of LAFC and which shared Los Angeles (and their home stadium) with the Galaxy from 2005 to 2014.

Moniker

"El Tráfico" (literally "The Traffic" in Spanish) was a name created by MLS fans and adopted by media outlets following polls by SB Nation blogs LAG Confidential and Angels on Parade. It refers to the notorious traffic congestion in Los Angeles, among the worst in the United States and the world, while also serving as a pun on "El Clasico". MLS has no plans to trademark the name. The rivalry has also been called the "Los Angeles Derby", a moniker that was also used for the SuperClasico. The name "El Tráfico" has faced opposition from executives within LAFC, coach Bob Bradley, and the president of the 3252, LAFC's largest supporters group.

Results

Summary

Matches

† Matches played behind closed doors or reduced capacity due to the COVID-19 pandemic.

‡ Although the match was part of the MLS is Back Tournament, group stage matches count toward regular season MLS statistics.

* Originally scheduled for February 25, 2023, but rescheduled to July 4 due to inclement weather.

Western Conference standings finishes

• Total: LAFC with 4 higher finishes, LA Galaxy with 1.

Top goalscorers

Players who have played for both clubs 
LAFC, then LA Galaxy
  Niko Hämäläinen
  Raheem Edwards

Other significant sports rivalries within the Greater Los Angeles area 
Major League Baseball: Freeway Series
National Hockey League: Freeway Face-Off

 National Basketball Association: Lakers–Clippers rivalry
College football: UCLA–USC rivalry

References

See also
MLS rivalry cups

LA Galaxy
Los Angeles FC
Major League Soccer rivalries
2018 establishments in California
Nicknamed sporting events